Katuli Union is a union of Tangail Sadar Upazila, Tangail District, Bangladesh.

Demographics
According to the 2011 Bangladesh census, Katuli Union had 6,433 households and a population of 29,811. The literacy rate (age 7 and over) was 33% (male: 37.1%, female: 29.2%).

See also
 Union Councils of Tangail District

References

Populated places in Tangail District
Unions of Tangail Sadar Upazila